King Edward VI Grammar School (sometimes abbreviated to KEVIGS) is a grammar school located in Louth, Lincolnshire, England.

History 
As early as the 8th century schooling was available at Louth,  but the oldest reference to a school is in a passage by Simon De Luda, the town's schoolmaster, in 1276.

The Dissolution of the Monasteries in 1548 placed the future of education in Louth at risk. Leading figures in the local community petitioned the King, Edward VI, to secure the school's future, and on 21 September 1551 the school was given a plot of land and money raised from three fairs by the king, which was administered by a Foundation which still exists today. In 1564, Elizabeth I granted the manor of Louth and some additional property to support the school.

Until 1964 King Edward's was a boys' school. In 1903 a girls' boarding school for 400 pupils was established nearby in Westgate House on Westgate, which became King Edward VI Girls' Grammar School. Both schools amalgamated in 1965 when administered by the Lindsey County Council Education Committee. Between 1968 and 1997, the school was for 14-18 year old pupils only, with the majority of entrants transferring from 3 local high schools. Although the school was selective for 14-16 year olds during this time, the school was called "King Edward VI School" (sometimes abbreviated to "KEVIS").

School male boarders lived at The Lodge on Edward Street until 1971, afterwards at The Sycamores on Westgate, and later at an old maternity hospital on Crowtree Lane next to the main school building. Girls boarded at Masson House and The Limes houses on Westgate.

In 2007 the school made the news after agreeing to pay a former teacher £625,000 - the largest ever teacher compensation package - following a 3-year battle by teachers' union NASUWT, after he was permanently crippled by an electric shock caused by faulty wiring in a science lab.

Previously a foundation school administered by Lincolnshire County Council, King Edward VI Grammar School converted to academy status in September 2015. However the school continues to coordinate with Lincolnshire County Council for admissions.

Admissions
Pupils pass the 11-plus examination to attend the school, and many come from satellite villages surrounding it.

Notable former pupils

 Rt Rev William Elsey, Bishop of Kalgoorlie from 1919–50
 Edward John Eyre (5 August 1815 – 30 November 1901), explorer of the Australian continent and Governor of Jamaica
 Andrew Faulds, Labour MP from 1966–74 for Smethwick, and from 1974–97 for Warley East
 Frederick Flowers
 Sir John Franklin, author and explorer, who attended from 1797 to 1800
 Rt Rev Field Flowers Goe, Bishop of Melbourne from 1887–1901
 Simon Hanson, drummer with the band Squeeze
 Tom Hood, playwright
 Francis Hopwood, 1st Baron Southborough CMG CB
 Jonathan Hutton, ecologist, Executive Director of WWF International Global Conservation
 Christopher Maltman, opera singer
 Robert Mapletoft, Master from 1664–77 of Pembroke College, Cambridge
 Nathan McCree, music producer and composer of the original Tomb Raider game music
 Philip Norton, Baron Norton of Louth, Professor of Government since 1986 at the University of Hull
 Rowland Parker, historian
 Captain John Smith, a mercenary and the first elected president of Virginia, famous for his supposed relations with Pocahontas, attended from 1592 to 1595
 George Storer, Conservative MP from 1874-85 for South Nottinghamshire
 Charles Heathcote Tatham, (1772–1842) architect
 Alfred, Lord Tennyson, poet, who attended from 1816 to 1820
 Lieutenant Colonel Thomas Watson VC

Previous Headteachers

Herbert Branston Gray (1878–1880)
Mungo Travers Park (1880–1884)
William Walter Hopwood (1885–1900)
A.H. Worrell (1900–1911)
S.R. Unwin (1911–1917)
E.A. Gardiner (1917–1941)
Hedley Warr (1941–1958)
Donald Witney (1958–1981)
John Haden (1982–1992)
James Wheeldon (1992–2006?)
Claire Hewitt (2006?–2008)
James Lascelles (2009–Present)

References

External links 
 King Edward VI Grammar School, Louth

Educational institutions established in the 13th century
Grammar schools in Lincolnshire
Louth, Lincolnshire
1276 establishments in England

Academies in Lincolnshire
King Edward VI Schools